Lozzo Atestino is a comune (municipality) in the Province of Padua in the Italian region Veneto, located about  southwest of Venice and about  southwest of Padua, in the Colli Euganei regional park. 

Lozzo Atestino borders the following municipalities: Agugliaro, Baone, Cinto Euganeo, Este, Noventa Vicentina, Ospedaletto Euganeo, Vo.

People

 Nevio Scala (football player and coach) was born and still lives in Lozzo Atestino

References

Cities and towns in Veneto